This is the list of players that have played for the Chad national football team.

References

 International
Chad
Association football player non-biographical articles